Cellulomonas phragmiteti is a Gram-positive, moderately halophilic, alkalitolerant, facultatively anaerobic and motile bacterium from the genus Cellulomonas which has been isolated from the plant Phragmites australis from the Kiskunság National Park in Hungary.

References

 

Micrococcales
Bacteria described in 2011